Post-amendment to the Tamil Nadu Entertainments Tax Act 1939 on 1 April 1958, Gross jumped to 140 per cent of Nett Commercial Taxes Department disclosed 56 crore in entertainment tax revenue for the year.

The following is a list of films produced in the Tamil film industry in India in 1985, in alphabetical order.

References

1985
Films, Tamil
Lists of 1985 films by country or language
1980s Tamil-language films